Shahidi Masjid is a three-storey mosque of Kishoreganj District, Bangladesh. It has a 5-storey minaret attached to it.

History
The mosque was previously known as the Jame Masjid. On 24 October 1942, in the midst of communal tensions, police fired on worshipers in the mosque, killing several. After that it was renamed Shahidi Masjid (Martyrs Mosque).

In 1938, Athar Ali Bengali arrived to Kishoreganj where he rebuilt the mosque and served as an imam there. In 1945, Ali established the Jamia Emdadia Madrasa in Kishoreganj on the premises of the mosque. He established the 5-storey minaret in 1957.

References

Mosques in Bangladesh
Kishoreganj District